"Give a Little Whistle" is a song written by Leigh Harline and Ned Washington for Walt Disney's 1940 adaptation of Pinocchio. The original version was sung by Cliff Edwards in the character of Jiminy Cricket and Dickie Jones in the character of Pinocchio, and is teaching how to whistle in the film. It is one of two original songs to not appear in Disney's 2022 live-action remake of the film, along with "Little Wooden Head"..

In the film
Jiminy Cricket hopped on Pinocchio's toes, attempts the whistle on the two failures. Jiminy whistles three times for Pinocchio on the last whistle. Jiminy starts to dance and hopped on to the shelf to sing to him, blows the whistle on his top hat into the echo and dances on the shelf. Pinocchio blows his hat and there's nothing in there. Jiminy says, "Pucker up and blow!" and he's on the jug to blows it like the bass music. Pinocchio stands up to sing. Until Jiminy Cricket balances on the violin with the violin string on his feet to slide up and down before he walked to sing, "And always let your conscience be your guide!" And the string breaks to snapped him out of the scene.

In the scenes of Jiminy Cricket, he's goofing around with his red umbrella for the imitating trombone and he looked at the pipe to smell on his nose to going reel around the circle until Jiminy is falling off the shelf. Until the saw is on the wooden plane on the workbench. Jiminy Cricket is falling from the shelf and lands on to the saw, as he jumped up before the saw is whistling. Before, Jiminy Cricket has two legs up to bounce and lands on the saw for legs split on his crotch and his butt on the seesaw as his pants or diapers. The saw lifts him up and Jiminy fixed his yellow necktie and lands on the saw again to fly up highest like a bird. Until Jiminy Cricket is ready to dive on the saw like the springboard to spring into the cuckoo clock to make the tap dancing to fixed the hand on 11:30, as he knocked on the door and marched like the band leader with the Swiss family and cow and a maid. When Jiminy finished the song to her and followed her to sing, "And always let your conscience be your guide!" And the door closed to Jiminy's face.

Pinocchio dances to sing, "And always let your conscience be your guide!" And he tripped over the cans to fall from the workbench into the floor with the junk is crashing while Geppetto and the animals wake to hear the noise.

Other versions
 Doris Day - included on her 1964 album With a Smile and a Song.
 Julie London - for her album Nice Girls Don't Stay for Breakfast (1967)
 June Christy - on her 1960 album The Cool School.

References

1940 songs
Songs based on fairy tales
Songs with music by Leigh Harline
Songs with lyrics by Ned Washington
Disney songs
Songs written for animated films
Pinocchio (1940 film)